Borboropactus is a genus of crab spiders that was first described by Eugène Louis Simon in 1884.

Species
 it contains seventeen species, found in Africa, Asia, and Papua New Guinea:
Borboropactus asper (O. Pickard-Cambridge, 1884) – Sri Lanka
Borboropactus australis (Lawrence, 1937) – South Africa
Borboropactus biprocessus Tang, Yin & Peng, 2012 – China
Borboropactus bituberculatus Simon, 1884 – China, Indonesia (Moluccas), New Guinea
Borboropactus brevidens Tang & Li, 2010 – China
Borboropactus cinerascens (Doleschall, 1859) – Malaysia, Indonesia (Java, Sumatra), New Guinea, Philippines
Borboropactus edentatus Tang & Li, 2010 – China
Borboropactus elephantus (Tikader, 1966) – India
Borboropactus javanicola (Strand, 1913) – Indonesia (Java)
Borboropactus jiangyong Yin, Peng, Yan & Kim, 2004 – China
Borboropactus longidens Tang & Li, 2010 – China
Borboropactus noditarsis (Simon, 1903) – West Africa
Borboropactus nyerere Benjamin, 2011 – Tanzania
Borboropactus semenchenkoi (Omelko & Marusik, 2022) – Malaysia (Borneo)
Borboropactus silvicola (Lawrence, 1938) – South Africa
Borboropactus squalidus Simon, 1884 (type) – West, East Africa
Borboropactus vulcanicus (Doleschall, 1859) – Indonesia (Java)

In synonymy:
B. bangkongeus Barrion & Litsinger, 1995 = Borboropactus cinerascens (Doleschall, 1859)
B. divergens (Hogg, 1914) = Borboropactus bituberculatus Simon, 1884
B. hainanus Song, 1993 = Borboropactus bituberculatus Simon, 1884
B. mindoroensis Barrion & Litsinger, 1995 = Borboropactus cinerascens (Doleschall, 1859)
B. umaasaeus Barrion & Litsinger, 1995 = Borboropactus cinerascens (Doleschall, 1859)

Nomen dubium
B. cinerascens (Strand, 1907

See also
 List of Thomisidae species

References

Further reading

Araneomorphae genera
Spiders of Africa
Spiders of Asia
Thomisidae